Neomonachus is a genus of earless seals, within the family Phocidae. It contains two species: the endangered Hawaiian monk seal, and the extinct Caribbean monk seal. Prior to 2014, all three species of monk seals were placed in the genus Monachus, but that was found to be paraphyletic.

Species

References

Phocins
Mammal genera
Mammal genera with one living species
Taxa named by Graham J. Slater
Taxa named by Kristofer M. Helgen